Cabañas is a municipality in the Honduran department of La Paz.

Demographics
At the time of the 2013 Honduras census, La Paz municipality had a population of 3,253. Of these, 85.93% were Indigenous (85.89% Lenca), 12.40% Mestizo, 0.86% Black or Afro-Honduran, 0.56% White and 0.25% others.

References

Municipalities of the La Paz Department (Honduras)